Karl Heinrich von Metternich-Winneburg (14 July 1622 – 28 September 1679) was elected as Archbishop-Elector of Mainz and Bishop of Worms in 1679, but died before he could be consecrated as a bishop.

Biography

Karl Heinrich von Metternich-Winneburg was born in Koblenz on 14 July 1622.  He was ordained as a priest in Mainz in 1655.  From 1664 to 1666, he was the rector of the University of Mainz.

The cathedral chapter of Mainz Cathedral elected Karl Heinrich von Metternich-Winneburg Archbishop of Mainz on 9 January 1679. On 25 January 1679 the cathedral chapter of Worms Cathedral elected him Bishop of Worms, thus continuing the personal union between the Archbishopric of Mainz and the Bishop of Worms that had existed since 1663. Pope Innocent XI confirmed both appointments on 4 September 1679.

He died on 28 September 1679, never having been consecrated as a bishop. He is buried in Mainz Cathedral.

References

This page is based on this page on German Wikipedia.

 

1622 births
1679 deaths
Archbishop-Electors of Mainz
House of Metternich